Unger may refer to:
 Unger (bishop of Poland) (died 1012), bishop of Poznań starting in 1000
 Unger, West Virginia
 Unger Island, a small, ice-free island of Antarctica

Unger is a surname of Germanic derivation, and may refer to:
 Andrew Unger (born 1979), Canadian writer
 Anna Unger, East German cross country skier
 Annette Unger (born 1962), German violinist and musicologist
 Anthony B. Unger (born 1940), American film producer (1973's Don't Look Now)
 Betty Unger (born 1943), Canadian politician
 Billy Unger (born 1995), American actor
 Brian Unger (born 1965), American comedian, writer, producer, and commentator
 Carl Richard Unger (1817-1897), Norwegian historian and philologist
 Caroline Unger (1803–1877), Austrian contralto
 Chris Unger, American association football (soccer) player
 Corey Unger, American musician
 Craig Unger, American journalist and writer
 Daffney Unger, stage name of American wrestler Shannon Spruill
 David A. Unger (born 1971), American literary and film talent agent
 David C. Unger (born 1947), American journalist
 Deborah Kara Unger, a Canadian actress
 Erich Unger (1887–1950), Jewish philosopher
 Felix Unger (born 1946), Austrian heart specialist
 Ferdinand Thomas Unger (1914–1999), American military officer
 Franz Unger (1800–1870), Austrian botanist
 Frieda Unger (1888–1975), German politician
 Garry Unger (born 1947), Canadian professional ice hockey player
 Gerhard Unger (1916–2011), German tenor
 Gerard Unger (1942–2018), Dutch graphic developer of type fonts
 Hans Unger (1872-1936), German artist
 Heinz Unger (1895–1965), German conductor
 J. Marshall Unger (born 1947), American linguist
 James Glenwright Unger (born 1985), American hockey player
 James J. Unger (1942–2008), American intercollegiate policy debate coach
 Jim Unger (1937–2012), British-born cartoonist
 Joachim Jacob Unger (1826–1912), Austro-Hungarian rabbi
 Joe Unger (born 1949), American film and TV actor
 Johann Friedrich Unger (1753–1804), German printer
 John Unger (born 1969), American state senator from West Virginia
 Jonathan Unger, American journalist
 Joseph Unger (1828–1913), Austrian Jewish jurist and statesman; converted to Catholicism
 Karen Unger (born 1960), American activist and commentator; married name Karen Kwiatkowski
 Kathleen Unger, American attorney and founder, president and CEO of VoteRiders
 Lars Unger, (born 1972), German footballer
 Lisa Unger, American writer
 Markus Unger (born 1981), German footballer
 Max Unger (sculptor) (1854–1918), German sculptor
 Max Unger (musicologist) (1883–1959), German musicologist
 Max Unger (born 1986), American football player
 Merrill Unger (1909–1980), Bible commentator, scholar, and theologian
 Mordechai David Unger, Hasidic Grand Rabbi of Bobov-45
 Oliver A. Unger (1914–1981), American film and television producer
 Peter Unger, philosopher at New York University
 Rhoda Unger, psychologist
 Richard Unger (born 1942), American historian and academic
 Roberto Mangabeira Unger, Brazilian politician, social theorist and law professor at Harvard
 Stephen A. Unger (born 1946), American executive recruiter, media and entertainment business
 Tobias Unger (born 1979), German athlete, specialist in 100m and 200m
 Anthony Charles "Tony" Unger (1938–2014), Rhodesian field hockey Olympian
 Wolfgang Unger (1948–2004), German conductor, especially choral conductor

See also 
 Ungar
 Ungerer (disambiguation)

German-language surnames
Jewish surnames
Surnames of Hungarian origin
Ethnonymic surnames
Russian Mennonite surnames